In mathematics, the Bochner–Martinelli formula is a generalization of the Cauchy integral formula to functions of several complex variables, introduced by  and .

History

Bochner–Martinelli kernel

(where the term  is omitted).

Suppose that  is a continuously differentiable function on the closure of a domain  in n with piecewise smooth boundary . Then the Bochner–Martinelli formula states that if  is in the domain  then

In particular if  is holomorphic the second term vanishes, so

See also

Bergman–Weil formula

Notes

References

.
.
.

.
.
.
,  (ebook).
. The first paper where the now called Bochner-Martinelli formula is introduced and proved.
. Available at the SEALS Portal . In this paper Martinelli gives a proof of Hartogs' extension theorem by using the Bochner-Martinelli formula.
. The notes form a course, published by the Accademia Nazionale dei Lincei, held by Martinelli during his stay at the Accademia as "Professore Linceo".
. In this article, Martinelli gives another form to the Martinelli–Bochner formula.

Theorems in complex analysis
Several complex variables